Oka Radha Iddaru Krishnulu is a 1986 Indian Telugu-language comedy film, directed and written by A. Kodandarami Reddy. It stars Kamal Haasan and Sridevi, with music composed by Ilaiyaraaja. It was inspired by the novel of the same name by Yandamoori Veerendranath.

Oka Radha Iddaru Krishnulu released on 2 October 1986 alongside A. Kodandarami Reddy's other film Rakshasudu and it became a rare incident when two films of the same director were released simultaneously. Both movies were written by Yandamuri Veerendranath and the music was composed by Ilaiyaraaja.

Cast 

 Kamal Haasan as Murali Krishna / Hari Krishna
 Sridevi as Radha
 Rao Gopal Rao as Narasimham
 Satyanarayana as Satyam / Jango
 Rajendra Prasad as Prasad
 Nutan Prasad as Inspector Koteswara Rao
 Suthi Veerabhadra Rao as Anjneelu
 Rajeev as Raja
 Ramana Murthy as Narayana Rao
 P. J. Sarma as Jailor
 Bhemiswara Rao as Principal
 Telephone Satyanarayana
 KK Sarma as Hostel Warden
 Chidatala Appa Rao as Barber Appa Rao
 Dham
 Annapurna as Parvathi
 Jayamalini as item number
 Samyukta
 Bindu Ghosh as Andallamma
 Chilakala Radha as Servant
 Kalpana Rai as Hostel Warden
 Nirmalamma as Bamma

Soundtrack 
The music was composed by Ilaiyaraaja. Lyrics were written by Veturi. Music was released on Echo Audio Company.

References

External links 
 

1980s Telugu-language films
Films based on Indian novels
Films based on novels by Yandamuri Veerendranath
Films directed by A. Kodandarami Reddy
Films scored by Ilaiyaraaja